The Sligo and Cashel Disfranchisement Act 1870 (c. 38) is an Act of the Parliament of the United Kingdom which removed the separate franchise from the parliamentary boroughs of Sligo and Cashel. This followed allegations of corrupt practices at the 1868 general election and a report under the Parliamentary Elections Act 1868.

Those previously eligible were to have the right to vote in the county constituencies of County Sligo and County Tipperary respectively, except for certain named within the reports which led to the legislation.

References

1870 in Ireland
Acts of the Parliament of the United Kingdom concerning Ireland
History of Ireland (1801–1923)
United Kingdom Acts of Parliament 1870
Electoral reform in Ireland (1801–1921)